This is a list of prisons within Henan province of the People's Republic of China.

Sources 
 

Buildings and structures in Henan
Henan